The Lincoln Tunnel Helix, known commonly as The Helix or the Route 495 Helix, is an elevated freeway that carries New Jersey Route 495 to and from the Lincoln Tunnel in Weehawken, New Jersey. It is an oval-shaped 270-degree loop between the Palisades cliffs and the tunnel’s toll plaza. The structure, built in 1937, is owned, operated and maintained by the Port Authority of New York and New Jersey (PANYNJ).

Description

Route 495 crosses through the northern part of Hudson County connecting the New Jersey Turnpike/Interstate 95 and Route 3 to the Lincoln Tunnel.

The Helix was built in order to connect Route 495 at the top of the cliffs to the portal for the Lincoln Tunnel at the bottom. The Helix has traditionally been known for offering a panoramic view of the Manhattan skyline. While local zoning laws prohibit the construction of high-rise buildings that would obstruct sight-lines from higher points in town,  construction of a new residential building partially blocked the view from the lower portion of the roadway.

The Helix is seven lanes wide, with three lanes eastbound (inner loop) and four westbound (outer loop); the inner most lane of the westbound side is the exclusive reversible bus lane, which gives buses a dedicated eastbound lane to the tunnel on most weekday mornings. The Port Authority of New York and New Jersey (PANYNJ), the owner/operator of the structure, defines the Helix to begin at Route 495 mile mark 1.8, at the eastbound exit for Pleasant Ave. It turns approximately 270 degrees clockwise to touch ground about  short of the toll plaza, after which the tunnel itself takes a 90 degree turn towards Manhattan to complete the oval.

History
When finding a way to build a highway to the Lincoln Tunnel, the Palisades cliffs presented an obstacle. Originally, it was proposed that the highway would cut through Weehawken and North Bergen via an underground land tunnel that would go straight to the toll plaza or the tunnel itself; instead the PANYNJ realized this was not feasible and would disrupt much of the cities, so they opted to build the Helix instead, which instead goes over and above the cliffs to make an oval-shaped loop above below roads, including JFK Boulevard East.

When it was originally built in 1937, the Helix had six lanes; it was widened to seven in 1957. From 2012 to 2014 the Helix underwent nightly eastbound closures for extensive repairs.

, the Helix was considered by the PANYNJ to have a working life-span of ten years. Alternatives to its replacement included tunnels under the Palisades directly to the Lincoln Tunnel portals. It is expected to undergo full rehabilitation starting in 2023 and is expected to be fully refurbished by 2027, though it is unclear what stage it is at.

References

Lincoln Tunnel
Weehawken, New Jersey
Bridges in Hudson County, New Jersey